"Darkness" is a maxi-single from the recording sessions of hard rock band Aerosmith's eighth album Done with Mirrors.

The song originally appeared as the last track on the album's cassette and CD issues (it did not appear on the vinyl version). It was then issued in 1986 as the album's second commercially released single in the US (following "Shela"), and was the fourth and final promo-single taken from the album.

Track listing
12" vinyl:
"Darkness" – 3:42
"She's on Fire (Live)" – 6:02
"The Hop (Live)" – 5:40
"My Fist Your Face (Live)" – 4:30
All live tracks recorded at Worcester, Massachusetts on March 12, 1986.

Release
The single was released as a limited edition 12-inch vinyl and cassette single in Canada. The single was backed by three b-sides, all live tracks recorded at a live performance at The Centrum, Worcester, Massachusetts on March 12, 1986. The show was a part of the Done with Mirrors Tour.

Personnel
Aerosmith
Tom Hamilton – bass
Joey Kramer – drums
Joe Perry – guitar, backing vocals
Steven Tyler – lead vocals, harmonica, piano
Brad Whitford – guitar

Other personnel
Ted Templeman – producer (track 1)
Aerosmith – producer (tracks 2–4)
Bob Demuth – recording engineer
Sam Kopper – recording engineer
Steve Corbiere – recording engineer

References

Aerosmith songs
1986 singles
Songs written by Steven Tyler
Song recordings produced by Ted Templeman
Geffen Records singles